The following is a list of managers of Aberdeen F.C. since its foundation in 1903. As of February 2014, Aberdeen have had 23 full-time managers, including joint managers.

The most successful Aberdeen manager is Sir Alex Ferguson, who won three Scottish Premier Division titles, four Scottish Cup trophies, one Scottish League Cup, one European Cup Winners' Cup and one UEFA Super Cup in an eight-year spell at the club.

Statistics

Entries in italics are caretaker managers.

Only competitive league matches are counted.

References

Managers
 
Aberdeen
Managers